Magnolia krusei is a species of plant in the family Magnoliaceae. It is endemic to Mexico.

Description
Magnolia krusei is a medium-sized to large tree, growing ups to 25 meters high with a trunk diameter of 50 to 100 cm. It is similar in appearance to Magnolia iltisiana and M. tamaulipana, but differs from those related species in its smaller flowers and follicles. The seeds are spread by birds.

Range and habitat

Magnolia krusei is known from one location in the Sierra Madre del Sur of central Guerrero state, around Acahuizotla and San Roque in the mountains south of Chilpancingo. A second population may occur further east in the Sierra Madre del Sur of neighboring Oaxaca state. Its known population  has an estimated area of occupancy of only 10 to 500 km2. The area of potential forest remaining in the area is 9,120 km2.

It is found in montane cloud forests dominated by oaks (Quercus spp.) on soils derived from shale rocks between 1140 and 1600 meters elevation.

Conservation
The species threatened by habitat loss from forest clearance, including for illegal crops. Its known populations are outside protected areas, and there is no plan for the species' conservation. It is assessed as endangered.

References

krusei
Endemic flora of Mexico
Cloud forest flora of Mexico
Flora of the Sierra Madre del Sur
Trees of Guerrero
Plants described in 2005